The 2011 Asian Fencing Championships was held in Seoul, South Korea from 8 July to 13 July 2011.

Medal summary

Men

Women

Medal table

References

Results

External links
Official website

Asian Championship
F
Asian Fencing Championships
2010s in Seoul
2011 in South Korea
International fencing competitions hosted by South Korea
July 2011 sports events in South Korea